Pangarap is a 1940 Filipino drama film directed by Carmen Concha. It stars Tita Duran, Angel Esmeralda and Benny Mack.

External links
 

1940 films
Tagalog-language films
Philippine black-and-white films